Eupromus simeco is a species of beetle in the family Cerambycidae. It was described by Holzschuh in 2013. It is known from Laos.

References

Lamiini
Beetles described in 2013